Ivari Padar (born 12 March 1965) is an Estonian politician. He is a former Minister of Finance, Minister of Agriculture and chairman of the Estonian Social Democratic Party.

Padar was born in Navi, Võru Parish, Võru. He was Deputy Mayor of Võru from 1993 to 1994, Executive Chairman of the Võru Farmers Union from 1994 to 1995, and Assistant to the Chancellor at the Finance Ministry from 1995 to 1997. He was Minister of Agriculture from 1999 to 2002, Chairman of Võru City Council from 2002 to 2005, and a member of the X, XI, XIII and XIV Riigikogu. In April 2007 he became Minister of Finance. He led the Social Democratic Party from 2003 to 2009.

Padar was a Member of the European Parliament for Estonia from 2009 until 2014 and from 2017 until 2019. In parliament, he served on the Committee on Economic and Monetary Affairs (2009-2014) and the Committee on Civil Liberties, Justice and Home Affairs (2017-2019).

In addition to his political work, Padar is a member of the Reconciliation of European Histories Group.

Personal
Judoka Martin Padar is Ivari Padar's cousin.

See also
Taavi Rõivas' cabinet
Andrus Ansip's second cabinet

References

1965 births
Living people
People from Võru Parish
Social Democratic Party (Estonia) politicians
Finance ministers of Estonia
Agriculture ministers of Estonia
Government ministers of Estonia
Members of the Riigikogu, 2003–2007
Members of the Riigikogu, 2007–2011
Members of the Riigikogu, 2015–2019
Members of the Riigikogu, 2019–2023
Leaders of political parties in Estonia
Social Democratic Party (Estonia) MEPs
MEPs for Estonia 2009–2014
MEPs for Estonia 2014–2019
Recipients of the Order of the National Coat of Arms, 3rd Class
University of Tartu alumni
20th-century Estonian politicians
21st-century Estonian politicians